Lachlan Burr (born 27 September 1992) is a former Australian professional rugby league footballer who last played as a  and  for the North Queensland Cowboys in the NRL.

He previously played for the Canterbury-Bankstown Bulldogs, Gold Coast Titans and the New Zealand Warriors in the National Rugby League. In England, he played for the Leigh Centurions in the Super League, and on loan from Leigh at the Sheffield Eagles in the RFL Championship.

Background
Burr was born in Sydney, New South Wales, and played his junior rugby league for the Revesby Heights Rhinos before being signed by the Canterbury-Bankstown Bulldogs. He attended Picnic Point High School, where he represented the Australian Schoolboys in 2010.

Playing career

Canterbury-Bankstown Bulldogs
In 2008, while playing for the Canterbury-Bankstown Harold Matthews Cup team, Burr represented the New South Wales under-16 team. In 2009, he made his debut for the Bulldogs' under-20 side at 16 years old and represented the New South Wales under-18 team. In 2010, he represented New South Wales under-18 again, scoring a try in their 22–18 win over Queensland. Burr played for the Bulldogs' under-20 side until 2012, playing 73 games for the team.

In 2013, Burr moved up to the Canterbury-Bankstown New South Wales Cup team, winning the club's NSW Cup Player of the Year award. In Round 25 of the 2013 NRL season, Burr made his debut for Canterbury-Bankstown in a 34–14 win over the Penrith Panthers.

In 2014, Burr did not appear in first grade for the Canterbury club. On 21 September 2014, Burr was named on the bench in the 2014 New South Wales Cup Team of the Year.

Gold Coast Titans
On 4 September 2014, Burr signed a two-year contract with the Gold Coast Titans starting in 2015. In Round 1 of the 2015 NRL season, Burr made his debut for the Gold Coast, coming off the bench in a 18–19 loss to the Wests Tigers. In Round 15 of the 2015 NRL season, he scored his first NRL try in a 14–36 loss to the New Zealand Warriors.

In 2016, Burr played just three games for the Gold Coast, spending the majority of the season playing for the Burleigh Bears, the Titans' feeder club, in the Queensland Cup.

Leigh Centurions
On 27 October 2016, Burr signed with the Bradford Bulls. In January 2017, following Bradford's liquidation, he signed a one-year deal with the Leigh Centurions.

At the start of the 2017 season, Burr played three games on loan for the Sheffield Eagles, Leigh's dual registration club, in the RFL Championship. In his lone season with Leigh, Burr played 28 games, scoring three tries.

Canterbury-Bankstown Bulldogs (second stint)
In 2018, Burr returned to Australia, re-signing with the Canterbury-Bankstown club and played for their New South Wales Cup team. On 7 September 2018, he was named the Canterbury-Bankstown NSW Cup Player of the Year. On 23 September 2018, he came off the bench in Canterbury's NSW Cup Grand Final win over Newtown. The following week, he played for Canterbury in their NRL State Championship win over Redcliffe at ANZ Stadium.

New Zealand Warriors
On 19 November 2018, Burr signed with the New Zealand Warriors on a two-year contract.

In Round 5 of the 2020 NRL season, Burr played his 50th NRL game in a 37–26 win over the North Queensland Cowboys at Central Coast Stadium.

North Queensland Cowboys
On 21 October 2020, Burr signed with the North Queensland Cowboys on a two-year deal, joining his former Warriors head coach Todd Payten at the club.

On 24 February 2022, Burr retired from rugby league due to a chronic hip injury.

Achievements and accolades

Individual
Canterbury-Bankstown Bulldogs NSW Cup Player of the Year: 2013, 2018
New South Wales Cup Team of the Year: 2014

Statistics

NRL
 Statistics are correct to the end of the 2020 season

England

References

External links
New Zealand Warriors profile

1992 births
Living people
Australian rugby league players
Burleigh Bears players
Canterbury-Bankstown Bulldogs players
Gold Coast Titans players
New Zealand Warriors players
North Queensland Cowboys players
Leigh Leopards players
Sheffield Eagles players
Rugby league second-rows
Rugby league locks
Rugby league props
Rugby league players from Sydney